The M27 is a motorway in Hampshire, England. It was opened in stages between 1975 and 1983, providing the largest two urban areas in Hampshire (Southampton and Portsmouth) with a direct motorway link. An extension into the county of West Sussex was planned but never constructed. A number of smaller motorways were proposed, connecting the city centres of Southampton and Portsmouth to the motorway; of these only the M271 and M275 were built. Three sections of the M27 have since been widened to four lanes each way, the first between junctions 7 and 8, the second between junctions 3 and 4, and the third begins at the slip road where junction 11 joins until mid-way to junction 12.

Route
Running approximately parallel both to the coast of the Solent and to the A27, the M27 starts as an eastwards continuation of the A31 from Bournemouth and Poole, at Cadnam in the New Forest. The motorway meets the A36 from Salisbury, crosses the Wessex Main Line railway, and then meets the M271 to central Southampton. After the M271, the road becomes a dual four lane motorway and passes Rownhams services, it then meets the M3, (two lanes going off, two lanes continuing to the other side of the junction) reverting to a dual three lane motorway as it passes to the north of Southampton, passes Southampton Airport, meeting junction 7 and becoming dual four lanes again, then becoming dual three lanes after junction 8, it then runs alongside the West Coastway Line as it heads south-east towards Fareham. It then runs alongside the northern outskirts of Fareham, briefly with a fourth climbing lane in either direction, before its junction with the M275 to Portsmouth. Very shortly after this point the motorway ends, becoming the A27, a four lane dual carriageway almost to motorway standards until the junction with the A3 (M) motorway. The official reason for this section of road not being a continuation of the motorway is the hard shoulders being too narrow. Although the M275 which the M27 junctions with, has no  hard shoulders along its entire length.

History

Opening dates
The M27 was opened in stages (in common with many UK motorways) between 1975 and 1983.

Junction 1 to 2 opened 20 August 1975
Junction 2 to 4 opened in December 1975
Junction 4 to 7 opened in 1983
Junction 7 to 8 opened in February 1978
Junction 8 to 12 opened in March 1976

The South Stoneham Crematorium, which was located north of South Stoneham Cemetery, was demolished during 1973 to make way for the construction of the M27 motorway. The South Stoneham garden of remembrance is now located at the north end of the cemetery, adjacent to the motorway.

Unfulfilled plans
It has been said that the M27 was intended as a motorway connecting south coast towns from Penzance to Ramsgate. However the only proposal of a route similar to that was by the Institution of Highway Engineers in 1936.
Road developments in the New Forest are also restricted due to its national park status.

The M27 was meant to be extended to Chichester; a sign of this is the width of the A27 road between junction 12 and the junction with the A3(M), which has three or four lanes, a hard shoulder and grade-separated junctions. It is not part of the M27 as its hard shoulders are not quite wide enough to comply with motorway regulations.

The M272 was meant to go from junction 5 through Portswood to the centre of Southampton. The M272 was instead built (in much-reduced form) as the A335 Thomas Lewis Way.

Junction 6 was never builtthere were plans for a motorway spur (probably to be numbered M273) connecting the M27 to the centre of the Townhill Park area of Southampton.

A planned service area just east of junction 9 was never constructed.  The long westbound exit slip road at junction 9 was designed to allow an entry to and exit from the service area.

2015 incident 
In November 2015, an elderly woman died after falling from the A3057 bridge that crosses over the M27, into westbound traffic, just before junction 3. She had not taken her anti-psychotic medication, and escaped from her Southampton home through an upstairs window before climbing off the garage roof and running away.

Smart motorway conversion
In March 2018, work began to convert the section between junctions 11 and 4 to a smart motorway. The scheme will turn the hard shoulder into a permanent fourth running lane, adding refuge areas along the route and installing new CCTV and speed cameras with mandatory variable speed limit signs.

In early January 2019, official work began when average speed cameras were switched on between junctions 5 and 4. Average speed cameras further along on the scheme will be turned on as work continues along the route. The work has suffered repeated delays, originally due to be complete in Spring 2021. The commissioning phase began in mid February 2022, during which time the smart motorway technology will be tested, including stopped vehicle detection radars. This is with a fully open carriageway and a  speed limit controlled by electronic signs on new gantries and CCTV and speed cameras. The 60mph limit was lifted on 29 June 2022 when the upgraded section was fully opened and returned to the national speed limit.

Junctions

Data from driver location signs are used to provide distance and carriageway identifier information. Where a junction spans several hundred metres and start and end points are available, both are cited.

{| style="margin-left:1em; margin-bottom:1em; color:black; font-size:95%;" class="wikitable"
|-  style="background:#0080d0; text-align:center; color:white; font-size:120%;"
| colspan="6" | M27 motorway junctions
|-
!scope=col|miles
!scope=col|km
!scope=col abbr="Westbound"|Westbound exits (B carriageway)
!scope=col|Junction
!scope=col abbr="Eastbound"|Eastbound exits (A carriageway)
!scope=col|Coordinates
|- align="center"
| rowspan="2"| 0.01.2
| rowspan="2"| 0.0 2.0
| Road continues as A31 to The WEST, Weymouth, Poole, Bournemouth and Ringwood
| rowspan="2"|Terminus  J1
| Cadnam A336, Brook, Bramshaw B3079, Lyndhurst A337
| rowspan="2"|
|- align="center"
| The New Forest, Cadnam, Lyndhurst A337
| Start of motorway|- align="center"
|4.24.6
|6.87.4
| Salisbury A36, Fawley A326
| J2
| Salisbury, Romsey A36, Fawley A326, Paultons Park
| 
|- align="center"
|6.66.8
| 10.6  11.0
| Southampton, The Docks M271(S), Romsey M271(N)
| J3
| Southampton, The Docks M271
| 
|- align="center"
|
|
|Rownhams Services (Roadchef)|Services|Rownhams Services (Roadchef)| 
|- align="center"
|9.49.8
|15.2  15.7
| The MIDLANDS, London, Winchester M3
| J4
| The MIDLANDS, London, Winchester M3
| 
|- align="center"
|11.711.9
| 18.9  19.2
| Southampton, Eastleigh, Airport  A335
| J5
| Southampton, Eastleigh, Airport  A335
| 
|- align="center"
|
|
|  Non- existent|  J6|  'Non-existent'
|- align="center"
|15.515.7
| 24.9  25.2
| Hedge End A334
| J7
| Hedge End, Botley A334
| 
|- align="center"
|16.217.0
| 26.0  27.4
| Southampton, Hamble, East Docks A3024
| J8
| Southampton (E), Hamble A3024
| 
|- align="center"
|19.920.6
| 32.1 33.1
| Fareham (W) A27, Whiteley
| J9
| Fareham (W) A27, Whiteley
| 
|- align="center"
|23.223.5
| 37.4  37.8
| Alton A32 (No access from A32 to M27)
| J10
|  No exit| 
|- align="center"
|24.424.7
| 39.2  39.8
| Fareham (C) A27, Gosport (A32)
| J11
| Fareham (C) A27, Gosport (A32)
| 
|- align="center"
|27.728.1
| 44.6  45.2
| Portsmouth, Ferries M275
| J12
| Cosham, Paulsgrove, Hilsea A27, Portsmouth (W), Ferries M275
| 
|- align="center"
| rowspan="2"|29.0
| rowspan="2"|46.6
| Start of motorway| rowspan="2"|Terminus|  No exit, access to A3 via J12| rowspan="2"|
|- align="center"
| Cosham A3(N), Hilsea A3(S)
| Road continues as A27 to Havant, Portsmouth (E), Chichester, Brighton and London (A3(M))''
|- align="center"
|-
|colspan=6|Notes
Distances in kilometres and carriageway identifiers are obtained from driver location signs/location marker posts. Where a junction spans several hundred metres (yards) and the data is available, both the start and finish values for the junction are shown. 
Coordinate data from ACME Mapper.
|-

Nearby attractions

See also
List of motorways in the United Kingdom

References

External links

CBRD Motorway Database – M27
The Motorway Archive – M27
TAB-MSAS: Photo Gallery: M27

Motorways in England
Roads in Hampshire
Transport in Hampshire